Molly Tay (born 13 August 1952) is a Singaporean former swimmer. She competed in the women's 100 metre butterfly at the 1964 Summer Olympics. Tay competed at the 1964 Summer Olympics under the Malaysia flag. She failed to qualify from her heats.

Education 
Tay studied at Methodist Girls School and later Anglo-Chinese School. During her mid-twenties, Tay studied at Brigham Young University in the United States.

Swimming career 
Tay started swimming competitively at the age of 8. At 12 years old, Tay went to 1964 Summer Olympics at Tokyo, Japan where she failed to qualify from her heats in the 100m butterfly event.

At the 1965 Southeast Asian Peninsular Games (SEAP Games), Tay won silver medal for the 200m freestyle event, losing to fellow Singaporean swimmer Pat Chan. She won the silver medals for the 100m and 200m backstroke, losing both events to Cambodia's Chuon Kun. She also won the bronze medal in the 400m freestyle. She was also part of the 4 x 100m medley relay and 4 x 100m freestyle team which won the gold medals.

At the 1966 Asian Games, Tay with her sister, Tay Chin Joo, Chan and Jovina Tseng won the bronze medal for the 4 x 100m freestyle team event. At the 1967 SEAP Games, Tay won silver medal for the 200m freestyle losing to Chan again. She won the silver medal for 100m backstroke event and the bronze medals in the 100m freestyle and the 200m backstroke events. At the 1969 SEAP Games, Tay won silver medals again for the 100m and 200m backstroke events and the bronze medal in the 200m freestyle event.

Career 
After graduating from Brigham Young University, Tay worked as a Financial Analyst for Revlon in New York.

Personal life 
Tay has three siblings who are also national athletes for Singapore; Tay Boon Tiong Wilson (swimming and water polo), Tay Chin Hong Nora (springboard diving), Tay Chin Joo (swimming).

Tay is married and lives in Westchester County, New York.

References

External links
 

1952 births
Living people
Malaysian female butterfly swimmers
Olympic swimmers of Malaysia
Swimmers at the 1964 Summer Olympics
Place of birth missing (living people)
Asian Games medalists in swimming
Asian Games bronze medalists for Singapore
Swimmers at the 1966 Asian Games
Medalists at the 1966 Asian Games
Singaporean female butterfly swimmers
Singaporean female freestyle swimmers
Singaporean female medley swimmers
Competitors at the 1965 Southeast Asian Peninsular Games
Competitors at the 1967 Southeast Asian Peninsular Games
Competitors at the 1969 Southeast Asian Peninsular Games
Southeast Asian Games medalists in swimming
Southeast Asian Games silver medalists for Singapore
Southeast Asian Games bronze medalists for Singapore
Malaysian female freestyle swimmers